The Keşla 2018–19 season is Keşla's first full season since the changed their name in 28 October 2017, and the eighteenth Azerbaijan Premier League season.

Season Events
On 5 June, Azer Salahli and Fuad Bayramov signed new one-year contracts with Keşla and Slavik Alkhasov signed a new two-year contract.

On 13 June, Keşla signed new one-year contracts with Tarlan Guliyev, Jabir Amirli, Andre Clennon, Murad Gayali, Denis Silva and Adrian Scarlatache, whist Sertan Tashkin signed a new two-year contract.

On 22 June, Keşla agreed new one-year contracts with Orkhan Sadigli, Vagif Javadov and Ebrima Sohna.

On 17 July Yuriy Maksymov left Keşla by mutual consent. On 25 July, Mladen Milinković was appointed as Keşla's new manager.

On 28 July, Keşla signed Elnur Jafarov on a one-year contract.

On 9 August, Keşla signed Nikola Mitrović on a one-year contract.

On 14 August, Keşla announced the signing of Ruslan Nasirli on a one-year contract from MOIK Baku, and Samir Masimov on a two-year contract.

On 17 August, Orkhan Sadigli joined Sumgayit on a season-long loan deal, with Keşla announcing the signing of Edvinas Girdvainis the following day, 18 August.

On 1 October, Keşla announced the signing of Diallo Guidileye on a contract until the end of the season.

On 11 October, Keşla announced the signing of Jonathan Ayité on a contract until the end of the season.

On 29 October 2018 Milinković was sacked as manager, with Tarlan Ahmadov being appointed as his replacement on 30 October 2018.

Squad

Out on loan

Transfers

In

Out

Loans out

Released

Friendlies

Competitions

Premier League

Results summary

Results

League table

Azerbaijan Cup

UEFA Europa League

Qualifying rounds

Squad statistics

Appearances and goals

|-
|colspan="14"|Players away on loan:
|-
|colspan="14"|Players who left Keşla during the season:

|}

Goal scorers

Disciplinary record

Notes

References

External links 
 Inter Baku at Soccerway.com

Shamakhi FK seasons
Azerbaijani football clubs 2018–19 season
Keşla